House dance is a freestyle street dance and social dance that has roots in the underground house music scene of Chicago and New York. It is typically danced to loud and bass-heavy electronic dance music provided by DJs in nightclubs or at raves.

Elements and characteristics

The main elements of House dance include "jacking", "footwork", and "lofting". The element of "jacking", or the "jack", – an ecstatic, sex-driven rippling movement of the torso – is the most famous dance move associated with early house music. It has found its way onto numerous record titles like the Jack Trax EP by Chip E. (1985), "Jack'n the House" (1985) by Farley "Jackmaster" Funk (1985), "Jack Your Body" by Steve "Silk" Hurley (1986), or "Jack to the Sound of the Underground" by Fast Eddie (1988).

House dance is often improvised and emphasizes fast and complex foot-oriented steps combined with fluid movements in the torso, as well as floor work. There is an emphasis on the subtle rhythms and riffs of the music, and the footwork follows them closely.

Notable dancers

In the early progressions of the dance, there were hundreds of phenomenal dancers that were key in its progression in this social dance scene. However, out of the many there were few instrumental in the introduction of house dance culture across the globe. Some of these dancers are Ejoe Wilson, Brian "Footwork" Green, Tony McGregor, Marjory Smarth, Caleaf Sellers, "Brooklyn" Terry Wright, Kim D. Holmes, Shannon Mabra, Tony "Sekou" Williams, Shannon Selby (aka Shan S), Voodoo Ray, and others.

Competitions and festivals

House Dance International: International competition and festival focusing on House Dance (USA)
Juste Debout:  Urban dance competition and festival, including House Dance as one major part of the event (France)
SDK Europe: Competition focusing on Hip Hop New Style, House Dance, Popping and Locking (Czech Republic)
House Dance Europe (Italy)
WDC (World Dance Colosseum) (Japan)
HOUSEDANCEFOREVER: International House Dance battle (Netherlands)
House Dance Conference (USA)

External links
 
Czarina Mirani: Spin Slide and Jack: A History of House Dancing on 5 Magazine, 2005.
 Makkada B. Selah: Powder Burns – Essay on house dance in Village Voice, 2007.
 Barry Walters: Burning Down the House, in SPIN magazine, November 1986.
 Phil Cheeseman: "The History Of House", on DJ Magazine, December 2003.

References

African-American dance
Syllabus-free dance
Culture of Chicago
Culture of New York City